Sa Kuko ng Agila, is a 1989 film directed by Augusto Buenaventura, written by Ricky Lee, and starring Senator Joseph Estrada alongside Senator Nikki Coseteng, Maria Isabel Lopez, Tommy Abuel, Paquito Diaz and Jinggoy Estrada. The film is a depiction of the real Olongapo City when the U.S. Military bases were still there.

Plot
Tonyo (Joseph Estrada), a mini-bus driver in Olongapo, opposes U.S. military bases in the Philippines. He saw the changes of the city after the military bases were established. Social problems of corruption, prostitution, poverty, and the plight of fishermen after the base appropriated much of the land and sea. The movie depicts his struggle between principle and practicality, a battle of healthy past and promising future and the quest for freedom and nationalism.

Full cast
Joseph "Erap" Estrada as Tonyo
Anna Dominique "Nikki" Coseteng as Cristy
Maria Isabel Lopez as Shirley
Paquito Diaz as Martin
Tommy Abuel as Lucio
Jinggoy Estrada as Caloy
Laurice Guillen as Lumeng
Subas Herrero as Jose Morelos
Ruben Rustia as Don Fernando
Dexter Doria as Lolit
Lara Melissa de Leon as Del
Ilonah Jean as Anna
Bomber Moran as Asyong
Caloy Salvador as Badong
Anna Ascalon as Photographer
Rene Matias as Sunga

Production
In early November 1988, Senators Joseph Estrada and Nikki Coseteng revealed to the press that they plan to star in a film called Sa Kuko ng Agila, which will revolve around the issue of United States military bases in the Philippines; the expected release date for the film was in February 1989.

Accoladess

References

External links

1989 films
1980s English-language films
Filipino-language films
Films about the military
Philippine action drama films
Tagalog-language films